Moma Airport  is an airstrip serving the village of Moma in Kasaï-Central Province, Democratic Republic of the Congo.

See also

Transport in the Democratic Republic of the Congo
List of airports in the Democratic Republic of the Congo

References

External links
 FallingRain - Moma Airport
 HERE Maps - Moma
 OpenStreetMap - Moma
 OurAirports - Moma
 

Airports in Kasaï-Central